Ubirajara is a municipality in the state of São Paulo in Brazil. The city was initially focused on the production of coffee beans, but successive issues with the good's price led them to shift towards the culture of rice, corn, beans, and cotton, as well as cattle raising.

References

External links
 Ubirajara municipality webpage in Brazilian Portuguese

Municipalities in São Paulo (state)